Cowichan River Provincial Park is a provincial park on Vancouver Island in British Columbia, Canada. It includes the Cowichan River in a 750-hectare area stretching almost 20 kilometres, from the village of Lake Cowichan to Glenora, just south of Duncan. Its paths are part of the Trans Canada Trail

References

External links 
 Official site - BC Parks

Provincial parks of British Columbia
Cowichan Valley
Year of establishment missing